XHXR-FM is a radio station on 100.5 FM in Ciudad Valles, San Luis Potosí. It is known as Radio Mensajera.

History
XEXR-AM 1260 received its concession on May 5, 1968. It operated with 1,000 watts.

XEXR received approval to migrate to FM on 106.9 FM in February 2011. The station moved to 100.5 on July 5, 2018; the frequency change was a condition of its concession renewal and clears the 106-108 MHz sub-band for community and indigenous radio stations.

References

External links
Radio Mensajera Facebook

Radio stations in San Luis Potosí